The Red Line is a part of the Hyderabad Metro system in Telangana, India. The line is 29.21 km and spans 27 stations from Miyapur to LB Nagar. It was funded by a public–private partnership (PPP), with the state government holding a minority equity stake. A special purpose vehicle company, L&T Metro Rail Hyderabad Ltd (L&TMRHL), was established by the construction company Larsen & Toubro (L&T) to develop the Hyderabad Metro rail project. 

The groundbreaking (Bhoomi Puja) for the project was conducted on 26 April 2012, and construction began with pillar erection on the same day. A  stretch of the Red Line from Miyapur to Ameerpet, with 11 stations, was inaugurated on 28 November 2017 by Prime Minister Narendra Modi, and opened to the public the next day The remaining section from Ameerpet to LB Nagar was opened on 24 September 2018.

The line spans over 29km covering 27 stations.

Construction
Red Line sections were opened as indicated below.

Stations
There are 27 stations on the Red Line. All stations are elevated.

References

Hyderabad Metro